Łyse  is a village in Poland, situated in the Masovian Voivodeship, in Ostrołęka County, and in Gmina Łyse, by the road 645 between Myszyniec and Nowogród.

In the years 1975–1998, Łyse belonged to the Ostrołęka Voivodeship.

Character 
The village is a center of Kurpiowski folk art with a 19th-century wooden church that has a polychrome interior. Mass is held in this church only on special occasions; regular mass has been held in the nearby modern church, Chrystusa Króla Wszechświata, since dedication in 2000.
 
The village has the lowest unemployment rate in Ostrołęka County, due in no small part to the local meat packing industry.

Easter in Łyse 
Every year a Palm Sunday (the week before Easter) festival is celebrated here. The highlight of the festival is a contest for the most beautiful palm. Traditionally, the hand-made flowers of the palm are begun at the beginning of Lent. During the festival, one can experience Kurpiowski traditions by, among others: Kurpiowski wycinanki, folk music and dance, and tasting bread slices with lard and pickles. 

Villages in Ostrołęka County
Łomża Governorate
Warsaw Voivodeship (1919–1939)